Robert Corbett was a Canadian politician.

Robert Corbett may also refer to:

Robert J. Corbett (1905–1971), Republican member of the U.S. House of Representatives from Pennsylvania
Robert Corbett (British Army officer) (born 1940)
Bobby Corbett (1922–1988), English football defender
Bob Corbett (footballer) (1895–1957), Australian rules footballer
Robert Paul Corbett, the author of LALR parser generators GNU Bison and Berkeley Yacc.

See also
Robert Corbet (disambiguation)
Corbett (surname)